Javier Ernesto Jiménez Scull (born November 16, 1989) is a Cuban volleyball player, who plays as an outside hitter for the Cuba men's national volleyball team. On 2014 he became the first Cuban player ever to be transferred to a non-Cuban team (PAOK VC) having acquired at first the approval of the Cuban Sports Ministry. He played for PAOK VC from 2014-2016 having a major contribution to the team's first ever Championship, including the first ever Double (Championship and Cup) on 2015 and the Championship of the 2016 Greek Volleyleague. During his period in Thessaloniki and PAOK VC he was much beloved by the PAOK fans, especially for his way of celebrating points.

Sporting achievements

National Championships/Cups

 2014/2015  Greek Championship, with PAOK
 2014/2015  Greek Cup, with PAOK
 2015/2016  Greek Championship, with PAOK
 2019/2020  Estonian Cup 2019, with Saaremaa

References

External links
 profile at FIVB.org
 FIVB profile
 Scoresway profile
 Jimenez is leaving PAOK
 Jimenez's first day at Thessaloniki

1989 births
Living people
Cuban men's volleyball players
Place of birth missing (living people)
PAOK V.C. players
Cuban sportsmen
Olympic volleyball players of Cuba
Volleyball players at the 2016 Summer Olympics
Expatriate volleyball players in Greece
Expatriate volleyball players in Italy
Expatriate volleyball players in Estonia
Central American and Caribbean Games medalists in volleyball
Central American and Caribbean Games bronze medalists for Cuba
Competitors at the 2014 Central American and Caribbean Games